Mount Lico is an inselberg mountain in the Alto Molocue District of Zambezia Province in northern Mozambique, most notable for its old-growth rainforest and its lack of penetration by humans.

In May 2018, Bayliss led a multidisciplinary expedition to scale the sheer walls of Mount Lico and begin the study of its unique habitat. Although it had been considered unlikely that humans would have entered the mountain's forest prior to this expedition, evidence of some limited human visitation was discovered in the form of several pots which had been placed, possibly for religious reasons, at the source of a stream on the mountain top.

See also
Afromontane
Mount Mabu

References

External links
 Audio: Exploring a hidden rainforest on an isolated mountain in Mozambique
 Why we explored an undisturbed rainforest hidden on top of an African mountain
 Lico: Mountain of Mystery
 The story of an expedition into an unexplored forest...
 Scientists are exploring a lost rainforest hidden in a Mozambique volcano for the first time
 Mozambique: the secret rainforest at the heart of an African volcano
 The Secret Garden: How Google Earth led a team of scientists to discover an untouched mountaintop rainforest
 Mongabay: Secrets revealed: Researchers explore unique, isolated forest in Mozambique
 Lonelyplanet: A hidden mountain rainforest has been uncovered using Google Earth
 DMM Climbing: Monte Lico’s rainforest ‘lost world’
 BBC News Mundo: El científico que descubrió gracias a Google Earth un bosque recóndito a más de 8.000 kilómetros de distancia de su casa (Spanish)
 Julian Bayliss: Mount Lico photos (Feb17, Nov17, May18 expedition)
 Outthere.fr: Comment Google Earth permet de faire d’incroyables découvertes naturelles (French)
 The man who discovered an unseen world

Lico
Alto Molocue District
Lico
Lico
Inselbergs of Africa